The Colorado Rockies are members of Major League Baseball (MLB) and based in Denver, Colorado. The Rockies have had seven managers since their founding in 1993. The Rockies' first manager was Don Baylor, who led the team for six seasons and qualified for the playoffs once. Former manager Clint Hurdle is the all-time leading manager in wins, losses, and games managed; Hurdle led the Rockies to the playoffs in 2007, the only time the Rockies have won the National League pennant.  The team was defeated in the World Series.

Table key

Managers

Statistics current through 2022 season

References

Colorado Rockies
Colorado Rockies managers
Managers